In some older systems of classification, Zoomastigophora is a phylum (more commonly known as zooflagellates) within the kingdom Protista. Organisms within this group have a spherical, elongated body with a single central nucleus.  They are single-celled, heterotrophic eukaryotes and may form symbiotic relationships with other organisms, including Trichomonas. Some species are parasitic, causing diseases such as the African Sleeping Sickness, caused by the zooflagellate Trypanosoma brucei. Zooflagellates have one or more flagella but do not have plastids or cell walls.

A few are mutualistic, such as those that live in the guts of termites and aid the bacteria present in breaking down wood.

References

External links

Eukaryote phyla
Obsolete eukaryote taxa